Gouri Kishan (born 17 August 1999) is an Indian actress who works in Tamil, Malayalam and Telugu films. She is known for her role of the younger version of Trisha's character Jaanu in the film '96 (2018).

Career 
Gouri G. Kishan played the younger version of Trisha's character, Jaanu, in the Tamil-language film, '96 (2018). She received the role after her uncle in Dubai told her about the casting call. Gouri was studying grade 12 and was called for an audition for the film. Her performance in the film received positive reviews and enabled her to receive further film offers. In 2019, she made her debut in Malayalam cinema with Margamkali (2019). She was set to make her debut in the film Anugraheethan Antony with Sunny Wayne, but the production of the film was delayed, which meant that Margamkali ended up releasing first. She starred opposite Bibin George in Margamkali. In 2019, she also starred in a short film titled Hi Hello Kadhal directed by lyricist Vinayak Sasikumar along with her friend Sarjano Khalid. She reprised her role as Jaanu in the Telugu remake of 96, Jaanu (2020), which marked her Telugu debut. Her performance in the film was praised by critics. Sangeetha Devi Dundoo of The Hindu remarked that "Gouri G Kishan as the teenage Samantha is brilliant". She played a college student in Master (2021). Gouri is also  starred in Karnan with Dhanush, which is directed by Mari Selvaraj. She will play one of the three heroines along with Rajisha Vijayan and
Lakshmi Priyaa Chandramouli.In the meantime during Pandemic Lockdown she shot a musical short film, Maraiyadha Kanneer Illai, virtually at her home and was released by Sony Music South.

Personal life 
Her mother is from Vaikom, Kottayam and father is from Adoor, Pathanamthitta. Her mother tongue is Malayalam. She spent much of her life in Chennai.
She pursued her Graduation in Triple major (Journalism, Psychology and English) from
Christ University, Bengaluru in 2020.

Filmography

Film

Webseries

Music videos

Awards and nominations

References

External links 
 
 

 

Living people
Actresses in Malayalam cinema
Actresses in Tamil cinema
Actresses in Telugu cinema
Actresses from Kerala
Christ University alumni
1999 births